Raza Mahmoudi (born May 12, 1984) is an Afghan football player. He plays for the Afghanistan national team.

National team statistics

External links

1984 births
Living people
Afghan footballers
Association football midfielders
Afghanistan international footballers